Park Gun-woo may refer to:
 Park Gun-woo (sailor)
 Park Gun-woo (actor)
 Park Keon-woo, South Korean cyclist